Robert Fred Ellsworth (June 11, 1926 – May 9, 2011) was an American legislator and diplomat. He served as the United States Permanent Representative to NATO (an ambassadorial-level appointment) between 1969 and 1971. He had previously served three terms as a Republican Member of Congress from Kansas, from 1961 to 1967, and as an Assistant to the President during the presidency of Richard Nixon; under President Gerald Ford, he was Deputy Secretary of Defense. Ellsworth also served as assistant to the chairman of the Federal Maritime Commission.

Ellsworth was born in Lawrence, Kansas, and was educated in the public schools of that city. He served in the United States Navy during World War II and the Korean War. In 1945, he was graduated with a baccalaureate in engineering from the University of Kansas, where he had been a member of the Alpha Nu chapter of the Beta Theta Pi collegiate fraternity. He then studied law at the University of Michigan Law School, from which he was graduated in 1949; he practiced law in Lawrence, Kansas, and in Springfield, Massachusetts.

The retired ambassador was admitted to the Order of Saint John as a knight of honor in 1995.

On November 9, 2010, Ellsworth provided commentary to KFMB regarding an unexplained missile launch off the coast of Los Angeles. He cautioned the news crew to wait for definitive answers from the military, then went on to speculate, "It could be a test firing of an intercontinental ballistic missile from a submarine, an underwater submarine, to demonstrate, mainly to Asia, that we could do that."

Ellsworth died in Encinitas, California: near the small city of Solana Beach, where he had founded and directed a research firm, Hamilton BioVentures.

References

External links
 Retrieved on 2008-03-31

1926 births
2011 deaths
Politicians from Lawrence, Kansas
Military personnel from Kansas
United States presidential advisors
Permanent Representatives of the United States to NATO
Massachusetts lawyers
Kansas lawyers
United States Navy officers
University of Kansas alumni
University of Michigan Law School alumni
Nixon administration personnel
Republican Party members of the United States House of Representatives from Kansas
20th-century American politicians
United States Deputy Secretaries of Defense